The Lawlers Gold Mine is a gold mine located 23 km south west of Leinster, Western Australia, owned by Gold Fields. Gold Fields purchased the mine in late 2013 and combined it with its nearby Agnew Gold Mine. The process plant of the mine was subsequently sold and dismantled while no mining was carried out at Lawlers.

It was formerly operated by Barrick Gold and part of its Yilgarn South operation, which consisted of Lawlers, the Darlot-Centenary Gold Mine and the Granny Smith Gold Mine. The mine is located in the Norseman-Wiluna greenstone belt.

History

Gold was first discovered in the region in 1892 and the town side of Lawlers, named after Patrick Lawler who found the first gold in a nearby creek, was established. Of the original town of Lawlers, only the old police station is still standing.

The site, was originally owned by Plutonic Resources, a major Australian gold mining and exploration company. Homestake Mining Company purchased Plutonic in April 1998 for more than $1.0 billion, and, in turn, Homestake was acquired by Barrick Gold at the end of 2001.

Ore at Lawlers is mined in an underground operation.

In June 2009, Lawlers has been certified as fully compliant with the International Cyanide Management Code.

In October 2013, Barrick finalised the sale of their Australian Yilgarn South mines, consisting of the Lawlers, Granny Smith and Darlot mines, to Goldfields. Barrick sold the mines as it considered them high-cost and required cash to compensate for the rising cost of its Pascua-Lama gold project. The three mines accounted for six percent of Barrick's annual gold output at the time. Goldfields purchased the mines for US$300 million, half of which had to be paid in cash while the other half could be issued in shares.

Gold Fields subsequently merged the operations with the nearby Agnew Gold Mine, closing the Lawlers processing plant and processing the ore mined at Lawlers at the Agnew plant. The plant was placed in care and maintenance and purchased by Kin Mining for A$2.5 million in June 2017. Kin relocated the movable assets of the plant 160km north to the Cardinia Gold Mine it was in the process of developing. Subsequently, ownership of the site and remaining plant components was returned to Gold Fields in 2020.

From its opening in 1894 to its closure in 2013, the mine had produced 2.27 million ounces of gold at an average grade of 4.1 grams of gold per tonne.

Production
Annual production of the mine:

Lawlers
Production of the mine as a stand-alone operation:

Yilgarn South
Production figures for the Yilgarn South operation, consisting of Darlot, Granny Smith and Lawlers:

References

Bibliography

External links 
 
 MINEDEX website: Lawlers Gold Database of the Department of Mines, Industry Regulation and Safety

Gold mines in Western Australia
Surface mines in Australia
Underground mines in Australia
Shire of Leonora
Barrick Gold